Jayant Yadav  (born 22 January 1990) is an Indian cricketer from Delhi who plays for Haryana in domestic cricket. He is an off spin bowler who bats right-handed. He made his international debut in October 2016.

Domestic career
In the 2014 IPL auction, Jayant was bought by the Delhi Daredevils (now Delhi Capitals) for INR 10 Lakhs. He played for them till 2018. Delhi Capitals transferred him to Mumbai Indians ahead of the 2019 IPL season.

In August 2019, Jayant was named in the India Green team's squad for the 2019–20 Duleep Trophy. Jayant was part of Delhi Capitals squad in the Indian Premier League 2018 but did not play a single match. In February 2022, he was bought by the Gujarat Titans in the auction for the 2022 Indian Premier League tournament.

International career
In September 2016, Jayant was added to India's Test squad for their series against New Zealand.

Jayant played for India against New Zealand at Vizag and took his first ODI wicket (Corey Anderson) in same match. He got his ODI cap from Virender Sehwag. Three weeks later, he made his Test debut for India against England at the same venue. He took his maiden test wicket in the first innings dismissing Moeen Ali on 1 run via Umpire Decision Review System. He became the 286th player to play Test cricket for India. Yadav played 42 first-class matches and picked up 117 wickets before he made his Test debut for India

Jayant is proving himself as a useful batsman besides specialist bowler for the team. In the first 3 tests that Jayant has played, he has scored one century and one half-century and has an average of over 73. He became the first batsman for India to score a century after coming at number 9. His partnership with Virat Kohli of 241 runs for 8th wicket is the second best in the world.

In December 2018, Jayant was named as the captain of India's team for the 2018 ACC Emerging Teams Asia Cup.

Personal life
On 19 November 2019, Jayant got engaged to his friend, Disha Chawla. Yuzvendra Chahal also attended their engagement.

Jayant is nephew of Yogendra Yadav, famous politician and psephologist.

References

External links
 

Living people
1990 births
Haryana cricketers
Delhi Capitals cricketers
India Blue cricketers
Indian cricketers
India Test cricketers
India One Day International cricketers
Indian A cricketers
Cricketers from Delhi
Mumbai Indians cricketers